Baciu is a commune in Cluj County.

Baciu may also refer to:

 Baciu (Olt), a tributary of the Olt in Covasna County
 Baciu (surname), a Romanian surname
 Baciu, a village in Blejești Commune, Teleorman County
 Baciu, a former village in Brașov County, now part of Săcele city
 Baciu, a tributary of the Râul Doamnei (Argeș basin) in Argeș County